Sixth-seeded Maria Bueno defeated Darlene Hard in the final, 6–4, 6–3 to win the ladies' singles tennis title at the 1959 Wimbledon Championships. Althea Gibson was the reigning champion, but was ineligible to compete after turning professional.

Seeds

  Christine Truman (fourth round)
  Angela Mortimer (quarterfinals)
  Beverly Fleitz (fourth round)
  Darlene Hard (final)
  Sandra Reynolds (semifinals)
  Maria Bueno (champion)
  Sally Moore (semifinals)
  Ann Haydon (quarterfinals)

Draw

Finals

Top half

Section 1

Section 2

Section 3

Section 4

Bottom half

Section 5

Section 6

Section 7

Section 8

References

External links

Women's Singles
Wimbledon Championship by year – Women's singles
Wimbledon Championships
Wimbledon Championships